The 1st Cavalry Division was a regular Division of the British Army during the First World War where it fought on the Western Front. During the Second World War it was a first line formation, formed from Yeomanry Regiments. It fought in the Middle East before being converted to the 10th Armoured Division.

Napoleonic Wars
During the Peninsular War, Wellington organized his cavalry into The Cavalry Division from June 1809 under Major-General Sir William Payne. This performed a purely administrative, rather than tactical, role; the normal tactical headquarters were provided by brigades commanding two, later usually three, regiments. On 3 June 1810, Payne returned home and his second-in-command, Major-General Stapleton Cotton, took command. Cotton was to remain in command thereafter and effectively acted as Wellington's chief of cavalry.

On 19 June 1811, the cavalry was reorganized as two divisions and The Cavalry Division was redesignated as 1st Cavalry Division with the formation of the 2nd Cavalry Division. The divisions were once again amalgamated as The Cavalry Division on 21 April 1813 with Cotton (Lieutenant-General from 1 January 1812) still in command.

First World War

The 1st Cavalry Division was one of the first Divisions to move to France in 1914, they would remain on the Western Front throughout the war. It participated in most of the major actions where cavalry were used as a mounted mobile force, they would also be used as dismounted troops and effectively serve as infantry.
On 11 November 1918, orders were received that the Division would lead the advance of Second Army into Germany, by 6 December, having passed through Namur, the Division secured the Rhine bridgehead at Cologne.

Order of battle in the First World War

1st Cavalry Brigade

2nd Dragoon Guards
5th Dragoon Guards
11th Hussars
1st Signal Troop, Royal Engineers
1st Cavalry Brigade Machine Gun Squadron (from February 1916)

2nd Cavalry Brigade

4th Dragoon Guards
9th Lancers
18th Hussars
2nd Signal Troop, Royal Engineers
2nd Cavalry Brigade Machine Gun Squadron (from 28 February 1916)

9th Cavalry Brigade

9th Cavalry Brigade was formed in France on 14 April 1915 with the 15th Hussars and the 19th Hussars. These regular cavalry regiments had been serving on the Western Front since August 1914 as divisional cavalry squadrons assigned to infantry divisions. The brigade remained with 1st Cavalry Division for the rest of the war.

Cavalry Divisional troops
III Brigade, Royal Horse Artillery transferred to 2nd Cavalry Division on formation on 17 September 1914
D Battery, RHA 
E Battery, RHA 
III RHA Brigade Ammunition Column
VII Brigade, Royal Horse Artillery
I Battery, RHA attached to 1st Cavalry Brigade from 17 September 1914
L Battery, RHA withdrawn after Action at Néry on 1 September 1914
(Tempy) Z Battery, RHA from 1 to 27 September 1914
H Battery, RHA from 28 September 1914, attached to 2nd Cavalry Brigade
1/1st Warwickshire Battery, RHA (TF) from 14 April 1915 to 21 November 1916, attached to 9th Cavalry Brigade
Y Battery, RHA from 1 December 1916, attached to 9th Cavalry Brigade
VII RHA Brigade Ammunition Column
1st Field Squadron Royal Engineers
1st Signal Squadron, Royal Engineers

Second World War

On 31 October 1939, during the Second World War, the 1st Cavalry Division was reformed. It was assigned to Northern Command, and took command of two pre-war First Line Territorial Army cavalry brigades (the 5th and 6th) and the newly formed 4th Cavalry Brigade. It was the only cavalry division in the British Army during the war.

It departed the United Kingdom in January 1940, transited across France, and arrived in Palestine on 31 January 1940. It served as a garrison force under British Forces, Palestine and Trans-Jordan.

In May 1941, the Divisional Headquarters and elements of the division (notably the 4th Cavalry Brigade), together with a battalion of infantry from the Essex Regiment (the 1st Battalion), a mechanised regiment from the Arab Legion and supporting artillery was reorganised as Habforce for operations in Iraq including the relief of the base at RAF Habbaniya and the occupation of Baghdad. Following this, in July 1941, Habforce was placed under the command of Australian I Corps and was involved in operations against the Vichy French in Syria, advancing from eastern Iraq near the Trans-Jordan border to capture Palmyra and secure the Haditha - Tripoli oil pipeline.

On 1 August 1941, the 1st Cavalry Division was converted into the 10th Armoured Division. 10th Armoured Division later fought at the Battles of Alam Halfa and El Alamein. The 10th Armoured Division was disbanded in Egypt on 15 June 1944.

Order of battle in Second World War

4th Cavalry Brigade

5th Cavalry Brigade

6th Cavalry Brigade

Support Units
The division also commanded the following support units:
104th (Essex Yeomanry) Regiment, Royal Horse Artillery
106th (Lancashire Hussars) Regiment, Royal Horse Artillery
107th (South Nottinghamshire Hussars) Regiment, Royal Horse Artillery
2nd Field Squadron, Royal Engineers
141st Field Park Squadron, Royal Engineers
1st Cavalry Divisional Signals (Middlesex Yeomanry), Royal Corps of Signals
550th Company, Royal Army Service Corps, TA

Commanders
The 1st Cavalry Division had the following commanders during the First World War:

The 1st Cavalry Division had the following commanders during the Second World War:

See also

British Cavalry Corps order of battle 1914
British cavalry during the First World War
List of British divisions in World War I
List of British divisions in World War II
British armoured formations of the Second World War

Notes

References

Bibliography
 
 
 
 
 
  History of 550 Coy RASC TA 1936-45 by Capt M B Phillips TD

External links
 
 
 
 BritishMilitaryHistory Palestine & Trans-Jordan 1930 - 1948

1
1
British World War II divisions
Military units and formations established in 1914
Military units and formations disestablished in 1919
Military units and formations established in 1939
Military units and formations disestablished in 1941
1914 establishments in the United Kingdom
Military units and formations of the British Empire in World War II